Leninsky is a rural locality (a settlement) and the administrative center of Leninsky District, Tula Oblast, Russia. Population:

References

Notes

Sources

Rural localities in Tula Oblast